Jean-Claude Perrot (8 March 1928 – 10 December 2021) was a French historian. He specialized in urban history, economic politics, demography, and statistics. His studies focused around 18th-Century France and he was a professor at the Sorbonne University Association and the School for Advanced Studies in the Social Sciences. He was also President of the French Institute for Demographic Studies.

Personal life and death
Born in Antony on 8 March 1928, Perrot studied at the Lycée Jean-Giraudoux. He earned a degree in history from the University of Poitiers and finished his studies at the Sorbonne. Prior to his military service, he taught at the Lycée de Saint-Brieuc. On 17 October 1953, he married fellow historian Michelle Perrot, with whom he had one daughter, .

Perrot died in Paris on 10 December 2021, at the age of 93.

Notable publications
"Rapports sociaux et villes au xviiie siècle" (1973)
"Genèse d’une ville moderne, Caen au xviiie siècle" (1973)
L’Âge d’or de la statistique régionale française : an IV-1804 (1977)
"La comptabilité des entreprises agricoles dans l’économie physiocratique" (1978)
"Les dictionnaires de commerce au xviiie siècle" (1981)
"Le présent et la durée dans l’œuvre de Fernand Braudel" (1981)
State and statistics in France, 1789-1815 (1984)
"Nouveautés : l’économie politique et ses livres" (1984)
"Les économistes, les philosophes et la population" (1988)
De la richesse territoriale du royaume de France (1988)
Une histoire intellectuelle de l’économie politique, xviie – xviiie siècles (1992)

References

External links

1928 births
2021 deaths
20th-century French historians
21st-century French historians
Academic staff of the University of Caen Normandy
Academic staff of the School for Advanced Studies in the Social Sciences
University of Poitiers alumni
People from Antony, Hauts-de-Seine